George Randolph Chester (January 27, 1869 – February 26, 1924) was an American writer and screenwriter, film editor, and director.

Biography
Chester was born in Cincinnati, Ohio, on January 27, 1869. He was the author of such popular works such as Get-Rich-Quick Wallingford and Five Thousand an Hour: How Johnny Gamble Won the Heiress that were made into silent films within his lifetime. His success in selling stories to The Saturday Evening Post and leaving his position with the Cincinnati Enquirer and moving to New York City to write fiction was the impetus for James Bearsley Hendryx to buy a typewriter and try his hand at writing fiction. Chester's first wife, Elizabeth Chester, divorced George in 1911, using the evidence that he was living at Gainsborough Studios in London with Lillian Josephine Chester. Elizabeth filed for divorced, and George and Lillian married while they were in Europe after hearing that the divorce was finalized. However, Elizabeth had only been granted an interlocutory decree, which made the divorce not final and therefore made his subsequent marriage to Lillian controversial. George and Lillian worked on several stories and plays together. George and Lillian only directed one film together, The Son of Wallingford (1921), which has been lost.

Chester died on February 26, 1924, of a heart attack in his New York City home.

Partial List of Written Works
Get-Rich-Quick Wallingford (1908)
The Cash Intrigue (1909)
The Early Bird (1910)
Young Wallingford (1910)
Wallingford and Blackie Daw (1911)
The Jingo (1912)
Wallingford in His Prime (1913)
A Tale of Red Roses (1914)

Partial filmography
The Making of Bobby Burnit (1914)
Get-Rich-Quick Wallingford (1916)
The Message of the Mouse (1917)
Twenty-One (1918)
Five Thousand an Hour (1918)
The Climbers (1919)
 The Vengeance of Durand (1919)
 The Tower of Jewels (1919)
 Slaves of Pride (1920)
Trumpet Island (1920)
The Birth of a Soul (1920)
Black Beauty (1921)
Get-Rich-Quick Wallingford (1921)
 The Son of Wallingford (1921)
Top o' the Morning (1922)
The Lavender Bath Lady (1922)
The Scarlet Car (1923)
Fools of Fashion (1926)
 The Head of the Family (1928)
New Adventures of Get Rich Quick Wallingford (1931)

References

External links

 
 George Randolph Chester at Projekt Gutenberg-DE (German) 
 
 
 George Randolph Chester, The Online Books Page, University of Pennsylvania
 

1869 births
1924 deaths
American male short story writers
Writers from New Rochelle, New York
20th-century American short story writers
Writers from Cincinnati
The Cincinnati Enquirer people
Journalists from New York (state)
20th-century American male writers
20th-century American non-fiction writers
American male non-fiction writers